Vincent Rodriguez III (born August 10, 1982) is an American stage and television actor. Rodriguez is known for playing the male lead role of Josh Chan in The CW comedy-drama series Crazy Ex-Girlfriend.

Early and personal life 
Rodriguez was born in San Francisco to Filipino parents and grew up in nearby Daly City. He is of Filipino, Latino, and Chinese background. He has three older sisters, all born in Manila. In 2003, he graduated from the Pacific Conservatory of the Performing Arts. He is also trained in martial arts. He moved to New York City in 2005 and appeared often as an ensemble cast member regional theatre productions. He also teaches annually at drama schools. On television he had bit roles on The Onion News Network and Hostages before landing his breakthrough role in 2015, when he was cast as Josh Chan, the romantic lead in Crazy Ex-Girlfriend.

Since 2015 Rodriguez has been married to Gregory Wright. As a gay actor, his performance as the straight lead in Crazy Ex-Girlfriend has received praise.

Filmography

Television

Film

Soundtrack

Stage credits

References

External links 
 
 

21st-century American male actors
American male television actors
Living people
American male film actors
American male voice actors
Male actors from California
People from Daly City, California
Pacific Conservatory of the Performing Arts alumni
American male actors of Filipino descent
1982 births
American gay actors
LGBT people from California
American LGBT people of Asian descent